Leontopodium andersonii is a species of plant in the family Asteraceae. It is native to China, Laos and Myanmar.

References

andersonii